Tommaso Merletti (born 10 September 2001) is an Italian professional footballer who plays as a centre back for  club Lucchese.

Club career
Formed on Milan youth system, Merletti joined to Serie C club Renate on 24 August 2020.

References

External links

2001 births
Footballers from Milan
Living people
Italian footballers
Association football defenders
A.C. Renate players
Lucchese 1905 players
Serie C players